Usuki Station is the name of two train stations in Japan:

 Usuki Station (Kagoshima) (宇宿駅)
 Usuki Station (Ōita) (臼杵駅)